Matterhorn Peak is located in the Sierra Nevada, in California, at the northern boundary of Yosemite National Park. At  elevation, it is the tallest peak in the craggy Alps-like Sawtooth Ridge and the northernmost  peak in the Sierra Nevada. The peak also supports the Sierra's northernmost glacier system. It was named after the Matterhorn in the Alps. Matterhorn Peak is near Twin Peaks, and just north of Whorl Mountain.

The peak can be ascended without climbing gear.

In popular culture
Jack Kerouac, in The Dharma Bums (1958), describes a hike up and a run down the mountain. This led to the classic observation, "You can't fall off a mountain."

See also 
 Hoover Wilderness
 Matterhorn

References

External links 
 
 In the Footsteps of Jack Kerouac on Matterhorn Peak

Mountains of Yosemite National Park
Mountains of Mono County, California
Mountains of Tuolumne County, California
Mountains of Northern California